Lagna Pathrike is a 1967 Indian Kannada-language film, directed by K. S. L. Swamy and produced by A. M. Sameevulla. The film stars Rajkumar and Jayanthi. The film has musical score by Vijaya Bhaskar.

Cast
 Rajkumar as Raghu
 Jayanthi
 Narasimharaju as Govinda, Raghu's friend
 Dwarakish as Ganesha, Raghu's friend
 Chi. Udaya Shankar
 Shivaram
 B. V. Radha
 M. Jayashree as Savitri
 Thoogudeepa Srinivas
 Jr. Revathi
 Srinath as stage actor (debut)
 Gangadhar as stage actor (debut)

Soundtrack
The music was composed by Vijaya Bhaskar.

References

External links
 

1967 films
1960s Kannada-language films
Films scored by Vijaya Bhaskar
Films directed by K. S. L. Swamy